3-Trifluoromethylphenylpiperazine (TFMPP) is a recreational drug of the piperazine chemical class. Usually in combination with benzylpiperazine (BZP) and other analogues, it is sold as an alternative to the illicit drug MDMA ("Ecstasy").

Pharmacology 
TFMPP has affinity for the 5-HT1A (Ki = 288 nM), 5-HT1B (Ki = 132 nM), 5-HT1D (Ki = 282 nM), 5-HT2A (Ki = 269 nM), and 5-HT2C (Ki = 62 nM) receptors, and functions as a full agonist at all sites except the 5-HT2A receptor, where it acts as a weak partial agonist or antagonist. Unlike the related piperazine compound meta-chlorophenylpiperazine (mCPP), TFMPP has insignificant affinity for the 5-HT3 receptor (IC50 = 2,373 nM). TFMPP also binds to the SERT (EC50 = 121 nM) and evokes the release of serotonin. It has no effects on dopamine or norepinephrine reuptake or efflux.

Use and effects 
TFMPP is rarely used by itself. In fact, TFMPP reduces locomotor activity and produces aversive effects in animals rather than self-administration, which may explain the decision of the DEA not to permanently make TFMPP a controlled substance. More commonly, TFMPP is co-administered with BZP, which acts as a norepinephrine and dopamine releasing agent. Due to the serotonin agonist effects and increase in serotonin, norepinephrine, and dopamine levels produced by the BZP/TFMPP combination, this mixture of drugs produces effects which crudely mimic those of MDMA.

Side effects 
The combination of BZP and TFMPP has been associated with a range of side effects, including insomnia, anxiety, nausea and vomiting, headaches and muscle aches which may resemble migraine, seizures, impotence, and rarely psychosis, as well as a prolonged and unpleasant hangover effect. These side effects tend to be significantly worsened when the BZP/TFMPP mix is consumed alongside alcohol, especially the headache, nausea, and hangover.

However, it is difficult to say how many of these side effects are produced by TFMPP itself, as it has rarely been marketed without BZP also being present, and all of the side effects mentioned are also produced by BZP (which has been sold as a single drug). Studies into other related piperazine drugs such as mCPP suggest that certain side effects such as anxiety, headache and nausea are common to all drugs of this class, and pills containing TFMPP are reported by users to produce comparatively more severe hangover effects than those containing only BZP. The drug can also cause the body to tremble for a long period of time.

Legal status

Canada
Since 2012, TFMPP has been listed as a Schedule III controlled substance in Canada, making possession of TFMPP a federal offence. It has also been added to Part J of the Food and Drug Regulations thereby prohibiting the production, export or import of the substance.

China

As of October 2015 TFMPP is a controlled substance in China.

Denmark
As of December 3, 2005, TFMPP is illegal in Denmark.

Japan
Since 2003, TFMPP and BZP became illegal in Japan.

Netherlands
TFMPP is unscheduled in the Netherlands.

New Zealand
Based on the recommendation of the EACD, the New Zealand government has passed legislation which placed BZP, along with the other piperazine derivatives TFMPP, mCPP, pFPP, MeOPP and MBZP, into Class C of the New Zealand Misuse of Drugs Act 1975. A ban was intended to come into effect in New Zealand on December 18, 2007, but the law change did not go through until the following year, and the sale of BZP and the other listed piperazines became illegal in New Zealand as of 1 April 2008. An amnesty for possession and usage of these drugs remained until October 2008, at which point they became completely illegal.

Sweden
As of March 1, 2006, TFMPP is scheduled as a "dangerous substance" in Sweden.

Switzerland
As of December 1, 2010, TFMPP is a controlled substance in Switzerland.

United Kingdom
As of December 2009, TFMPP has been made a Class C drug in the United Kingdom along with BZP.

United States
TFMPP is not currently scheduled at the federal level in the United States, but it was briefly emergency scheduled in Schedule I.  The scheduling expired in April 2004 and was not renewed. However, some states such as Florida have banned the drug in their criminal statutes making its possession a felony.

Florida
TFMPP is a Schedule I controlled substance in the state of Florida making it illegal to buy, sell, or possess in Florida.

Texas
TFMPP is scheduled in Texas under Penalty Group 2, as a hallucinogenic substance. It is illegal to possess TFMPP in any quantity in Texas.

Derivatives
Antrafenine
CPD-1

See also 
 Substituted piperazine

References

External links 
 Erowid: TFMPP Vault

Designer drugs
Trifluoromethyl compounds
Phenylpiperazines
Serotonin receptor agonists
Serotonin releasing agents
meta-Trifluoromethylphenylpiperazines